Coriocella nigra is a species of sea snail, a marine gastropod mollusk in the family Velutinidae. An Indo-Pacific species, it lives on rocks at depths of up to 15 m. It is up to 10 cm long and has an internal shell; body color is black or brown. C. nigra is probably a predator of tunicates.

Taxonomy
This species was described as Coriocella nigra by French zoologist Henri Marie Ducrotay de Blainville in 1824 and he placed it in the newly established genus Coriocella as its only species at that time. Coriocella nigra is the type species of the genus Coriocella. Nowadays, at least six other species are recognized in the genus Coriocella and Blainville's binomial name is still treated as valid and in use.

Distribution
The distribution of Coriocella nigra is Indo-Pacific and includes South Africa, Mozambique, Kenya, Madagascar, Mauritius, Réunion, Mayotte, Gulf of Aden, Gulf of Elat, South Button Island, Myanmar, Thailand, Indonesia, Papua New Guinea, northern Australia and eastern Australia, Philippines, Palau, Society Islands in French Polynesia, New Caledonia, Japan, and Hawaii. The type locality is Isle de France (Mauritius).

Description
The color of the body may vary from uniformly velvety black to brown. The mantle is broadly tuberculate. The borders of the mantle are delicate, notched in front and spreading out widely. The foot is small and oval. There are four or five lobes or bosses on the dorsal part of its body. There is an inhalant siphon extended in the middle of the front part of the body. The tentacles are triangular, granulated and are spotted with white. There are brown eyes at the base of the tentacles. The front part of the foot is grooved. There is a jaw and a radula with 48 teeth in the mouth. The body length is usually about 80 mm. The body length varies from 15–18 mm up to 10 cm. The width of the body is 8–10 mm (in body length 15–18 mm).

C. nigra has an internal and reduced shell, and spirally rolled radula, as have all the members of the family Velutinidae. The shell is conchinous and it has 2½ or three whorls. Whorls are expanding rapidly and the last whorl cover four fifths of the shell height. The color of the shell is translucent white. The shell is smooth with irregular growth lines. The aperture is large. Shell width is 6.3 mm (for a shell length of 10 mm). Shell length varies from 10 mm to 30–40 mm.

Ecology
It lives on rocky habitats. On Hawaii it lives among Halimeda kanaloana. In Australia it inhabits intertidal and subtidal zone . It has been reported from depths of 1–4 m, to 12 m and to 15 m.

C. nigra is carnivorous. Its probable prey are tunicates, including tunicates from the family Didemnidae in Hawaii. Its fecal pellets are oval and layered. Sclerites of Octocorallia have also been found in its gut.

The ostracod Pontocypria coriocellae lives as an occasional commensal in the oral tube of C. nigra.<ref name="Wouters 1991">Wouters K. (1991). "A new species of the genus Pontocypria (Crustacea, Ostracoda), commensal of a lamellariid gastropod". 'Bulletin. Institut Royal des Sciences Naturelles de Belgique. Mededelingen. Koninklijk Belgisch Instituut voor Natuurwetenschappen 61: 65–71. PDF.</ref>

The shell of C. nigra is sometimes used by a hermit crab, Clibanarius virescens.

Staurosporines 4′-N-demethyl-11-hydroxystaurosporine and 3,11-dihydroxystaurosporine have been isolated from C. nigra.

References

External links
 Vayssière A. (1911). "Recherches zoologiques et anatomiques sur les Opisthobranches de Ia Mer Rouge et du Golfe d'Aden". Annales de la Faculté des Sciences de Marseille tom. 20(Suppl.), fasc. 2: 1–157, pis. 1–11. Plate 11, fig. 167.
 Wellens W. (1998). "Redescription of Coriocella nigra de Blainville 1825 and Chelyonotus tonganus Quoy and Gaimard 1832 (Gastropoda: Prosobranchia: Lamellariidae)". Journal of Conchology 36: 43–61.
  沼波秀樹, 関田梨恵 & 荒井碧. (2007). "P16. 殻が内在するイボベッコウタマガイ (腹足綱: ハナヅトガイ科) の生き残り戦略 (日本貝類学会平成 19 年度大会 (豊橋) 研究発表要旨)". Venus: journal of the Malacological Society of Japan 66(1): 122. CiNii.
 Tryon G. W. (1882). Structural and systematic conchology: an introduction to the study of the Mollusca''. volume I''', Philadelphia, published by the author. plate 62, figure 62-63.
 Beechey F. W. (1839). "The zoology of Captain Beechey's voyage". London. page 133.
 Chenu J. C. (1859–1862) "Manuel de conchyliologie et paléontologie conchlyliologique". t. 1–2. Paris. page 212
 Coriocella nigra video
 

Velutinidae
Gastropods described in 1824